Rupert may refer to:

People
 Rupert (name), various people known by the given name or surname "Rupert"

Places

Canada
Rupert, Quebec, a village
Rupert Bay, a large bay located on the south-east shore of James Bay
Rupert River, Quebec
Rupert's Land, a former territory in British North America

United States
Rupert, Georgia, an unincorporated community in Taylor County
Rupert, Idaho, a county seat and largest city of Minidoka County
Rupert, Ohio, an unincorporated community in Union Township, Madison County
Rupert, Pennsylvania, a census-designated place (CDP) in Columbia County
Rupert, Vermont, a town in Bennington County
Rupert, West Virginia, a town in Greenbrier County

Saint Helena, Ascension and Tristan da Cunha
Ruperts, Saint Helena, a village in Jamestown District, Saint Helena

Fiction
 Rupert, a teddy bear owned by cartoon character Stewie Griffin on the television series Family Guy
 Rupert, a squirrel in the 1950 Christmas film The Great Rupert
 Rupert Bear, a fictional British cartoon character
 The Adventures of Rupert Bear, an early-1970s British television series based on Rupert Bear
 Rupert and the Frog Song, a short animated film released in 1984, based on Rupert Bear and created by Paul McCartney
 Rupert (TV series), an animated television series based on Rupert Bear produced in Canada in the 1990s 
 Rupert Bear, Follow the Magic..., a 2006 CGI series, based on Rupert Bear.
 Rupert of Hentzau, a villainous henchman in Anthony Hope's novels, The Prisoner of Zenda and Rupert of Hentzau
 Rupert Giles, a watcher on the television series Buffy the Vampire Slayer
 Rupert, a fictional planet from Mostly Harmless, the last book in The Hitchhiker's Guide to the Galaxy series by Douglas Adams
 Dr. Jacques von Hämsterviel, from Disney's Lilo & Stitch franchise

Other uses
 Rupert (paradummy), British nickname for decoys dropped during the 1944 invasion of Normandy
 , more than one ship of the British Royal Navy
 Rupert Bear Museum, a museum in Canterbury, Kent, United Kingdom
 Rupert, British Army slang for an officer; see

See also
Prince Rupert (disambiguation)
Saint Rupert (disambiguation)

Rupertia, a genus of flowering plants
Ruperto, a given name
Ruppert, a given name and surname